The Japan men's national water polo team is the representative for Japan in international men's water polo.

Results

Olympic Games

1932 – 4th place
1936 – 14th place
1960 – 14th place
1964 – 11th place
1968 – 12th place
1972 – 15th place
1984 – 11th place
2016 – 12th place
2020 – 10th place

World Championship

2001 – 16th place
2003 – 15th place
2005 – 14th place
2007 – 16th place
2011 – 11th place
2015 – 13th place
2017 – 10th place
2019 – 11th place
2022 – 9th place

World Cup
2018 – 7th place

World League

2006 – 15th place
2007 – 16th place
2008 – 11th place
2009 – 7th place
2010 – 11th place
2011 – 10th place
2012 – 11th place
2013 – 7th place
2014 – Intercontinental Preliminary round
2015 – Intercontinental Preliminary round
2016 – 6th place
2017 – 8th place
2018 – 4th place
2019 – 6th place
2020 – 5th place

Asian Games

1954 –  Silver medal
1958 –  Gold medal
1962 –  Gold medal
1966 –  Gold medal
1970 –  Gold medal
1974 –  Silver medal
1978 –  Silver medal
1982 –  Silver medal
1990 –  Silver medal
1994 –  Silver medal
1998 – 4th
2002 –  Silver medal
2006 –  Silver medal
2010 –  Silver medal
2014 –  Silver medal
2018 –  Silver medal

Asian Swimming Championships

2012 –  Silver medal
2016 –  Gold medal

Asian Water Polo Championship

2009 –  Bronze medal
2012 –  Bronze medal
2015 –  Gold medal

Current squad
Roster for the 2020 Summer Olympics.

See also
 Japan men's Olympic water polo team records and statistics

References

External links
Official website
 

Men's national water polo teams
 
Men's sport in Japan